Porqueres is a municipality located in the county of Pla de l'Estany, in the province of Girona, in the autonomous region of Catalunya of Spain. The municipality is made up of several villages. Mata, Les Pedreres and Miànigues, have the largest part of the population. At the top of the mountain range of Serra de Sant Patllari is the village of Pujarnol. In the west is Porqueres, and on the northern part of the Lake of Banyoles is Usall. Amid the green forests of the Ginestar mountains is the village of Merlant.

References

External links
 Municipality of Porqueres 
 Government data pages 

Municipalities in Pla de l'Estany
Populated places in Pla de l'Estany